Yecheng may refer to:

 Kargilik County, or Yecheng County (葉城), Kashgar Prefecture, Xinjiang, China
 Kargilik Town, or Yecheng Town, seat of Kargilik County
 Ye (Hebei), or Yecheng (鄴城)

See also
 Ye County, Henan
 Ye County, Shandong